Alexander Stewart was a Canadian politician, who was the mayor of Victoria, British Columbia from 1914 to 1916.

References

Mayors of Victoria, British Columbia
Year of birth missing
Year of death missing